Chempaka was a state constituency in Selangor, Malaysia, that has been represented in the Selangor State Legislative Assembly since 2004 until 2018.

History
2004–2016: The constituency contains the polling districts of Taman Nirwana, Angsana Hilir, Kampung Pandan Dalam Kiri, Lorong Raya Kampung Pandan, Pandan Jaya Utara, Taman Chempaka, Kampung Baharu Ampang Ketiga, Pandan Indah Jalan 1, 4 dan 6, Taman Dagang, Taman Cahaya, Lorong Molek Kampung Pandan, Lorong Bersih Kampung Pandan, Pandan Jaya Selatan, Taman Bakti, Pandan Indah Jalan 5, Pandan Mewah, Pandan Indah Jalan 2 & 3.

Representation history

Election results

References

Defunct Selangor state constituencies